Nuestra Belleza Chile 2015, the 3rd Miss Earth Chile Pageant, was held on October 3, 2015 at Puerto Marina Hall. Catalina Cáceres of Santiago crowned her successor Natividad Leiva of Providencia at the end of the event. She represented Chile at Miss Earth 2015 pageant and placed Top 8.

Placements

Special awards

Contestants

Pageant Notes
 This is the first time when regional and communal candidates are participating.
 This is the first time when the pageant is held outside Santiago, being it in Concepción.
 Miss Earth Chile 2015 winner, Natividad Leiva, previously competed in Miss Universo Chile 2014 where she finished as the 1st Runner-up.
 Carmina Grossi Alegría, Miss Earth Santiago Centro is the niece of actress Sigrid Alegría

References

Beauty pageants in Chile
Recurring events established in 2010
Chilean awards
Earth Chile